Group Portrait is a c. 1650 oil on canvas painting by the Flemish artist Jacob Jordaens (1593-1678). With Portrait of the Artist with his Family (1615), The Apostles Paul and Barnabas at Lystra (c.1618) and The Banquet of Cleopatra (1653), it is now one of four works by the artist in the Hermitage Museum in St Petersburg.

It shows four figures symbolising married love. The seated woman holds a parrot on her left hand and a floral crown (symbolic of marriage) in her right hand. A small Cupid touches the woman on the breast with his arrow while she rests her head on the breast of the man behind her. To the right a young woman runs another floral crown down her arm. Both women wear pearl bracelets. 

1650 paintings
Group portraits
17th-century portraits
Paintings by Jacob Jordaens
Paintings in the collection of the Hermitage Museum